Sean Cleary may refer to:
 Sean Cleary (footballer) (born 1983), Irish football player
 Sean Cleary (rugby league), Irish rugby league footballer
 Sean D Cleary, North Dakota economist and politician